A.B.M. Fazle Karim Chowdhury is a Bangladesh Awami League politician and the incumbent Member of Parliament of Raozan upazila in Chittagong District. He is the Chairman of the Parliamentary Standing Committee of the Railways Ministry.

Early life 
Chowdhury was born on 6 November 1954. He has a B.A. and a M.A. degree. His father was AKM Fazlul Kabir Chowdhury and his uncle was Fazlul Quader Chowdhury. His cousins and Bangladesh Nationalist Party politicians, Salauddin Quader Chowdhury and Giasuddin Quader Chowdhury, was a major political opponent of Chowdhury in Chittagong.

Career
Chowdhury was elected to Parliament in 2001 from Chittagong-6 as an Awami League candidate with 52 percent of the vote. He imported a duty free Mercedes-Benz using his privilege as a member of parliament. He faced two murder charges; he received acquittal in one and a discharge in another. Charges were pressed against him in 2003 over the murder of Srikanta Rakshit, a computer engineer, in Chittagong. He called it fake charges and blamed his political rivals, Giasuddin Quader Chowdhury and Salahuddin Quader Chowdhury. Charges were framed against him in the Chittagong Divisional Speedy Trial Tribunal in 2004.

Chowdhury was re-elected to Parliament from Chittagong-5 as a candidate of Awami League with 49 percent of the votes. Chowdhury served as the Chairman of the Parliamentary standing committee on the Ministry of Housing and Public Works. He was a member of the parliamentary standing committee on the Chittagong Hill Tracts affairs ministry.

Chowdhury was elected to parliament from Chittagong-6 in 2014 as an Awami League candidate in an uncontested election boycotted by other political parties. According to his wealth statement, he made significant profit from fish farming at around 25 million taka.

In January 2015, Chowdhury was elected to the Human Rights Committee of the Inter-Parliamentary Union.

Chowdhury was re-elected to Parliament in 2018 as a candidate of Awami League with 230, 471 votes while his nearest rival, Jashim Uddin Shikder of Bangladesh Nationalist Party, received 2, 244 votes. In December 2019, he stood for the election of President of Chittagong unit of Awami League but lost to MA Salam.

Chowdhury tested positive for COVID-19 in August 2020 during the COVID-19 pandemic in Bangladesh.

On 24 August 2021, Chowdhury chaired a meeting of the Parliamentary standing committee on the Railway Ministry. In November 2021, nearly all candidates, over 100, in the Union Parishad elections were elected uncontested as politicians from parties other than Awami League were prevent from standing by Chowdhury and Awami League activists allegedly. Chowdhury denied all allegations against him.

References

1995 births
Living people
People from Chittagong District
Awami League politicians
9th Jatiya Sangsad members
10th Jatiya Sangsad members
11th Jatiya Sangsad members
8th Jatiya Sangsad members